Michael A. Costanzo (born September 9, 1983) is an American former professional baseball third baseman. He played in Major League Baseball (MLB) for the Cincinnati Reds.

Amateur career
Costanzo played college baseball for Coastal Carolina University, and was named an All-American in his junior year. In 2003, he played collegiate summer baseball with the Bethesda Big Train of the Cal Ripken Collegiate Baseball League and was the team's MVP.  In 2004, he played collegiate summer baseball with the Hyannis Mets of the Cape Cod Baseball League.

Professional career
Costanzo was drafted by the Philadelphia Phillies pick #65 in the second round of the 2005 Major League Baseball draft. In
2005, Costanzo reported to Short-season A ball for the Batavia Muckdogs.
In 2006, Costanzo spends the season in High-A in Clearwater, where he is named Florida State League's Top defensive 3rd baseman.

2007 Costanzo is promoted to AA-Reading Phillies in the Eastern League and hits 27 Home runs with 86 RBI and is selected to the Eastern League All-Star game. He is selected to play in the Arizona Fall League for top prospects.

On November 7, 2007, Costanzo, along with Michael Bourn and Geoff Geary, is traded to the Houston Astros for Brad Lidge and Eric Bruntlett. On December 12, 2007 he was traded for the second time in 34 days to the Baltimore Orioles along with Luke Scott, Matt Albers, Troy Patton and Dennis Sarfate for Miguel Tejada. The Orioles released him on April 2, 2010. He signed with the Cincinnati Reds on May 13, 2010.

Costanzo is called up to the majors with the Cincinnati Reds for the first time on May 12, 2012. In his first Major League at bat, he hit a sacrifice fly to left field, which scored Ryan Hanigan from third base. On May 19, 2012 Costanzo got his first Major League Hit off of New York Yankees pitcher Iván Nova. Yankees shortstop Derek Jeter retrieved the baseball and tossed it into the Reds dugout.

On June 6, he was optioned back to Triple-A Louisville. On August 1, Costanzo was designated for assignment.

Costanzo was inducted into the Coastal Carolina University Hall of Fame in fall of 2012.

On December 28, 2012, he signed a minor league deal with the Washington Nationals. Costanzo was released by the Nationals in June 2013 and was signed by the Cincinnati Reds.

Costanzo represented Team Italy in the 2009 and 2013 World Baseball Classic.

After spending all of 2014 with the Cincinnati Reds AAA affiliate the Louisville Bats, Costanzo signed with the Camden Riversharks of the Atlantic League of Professional Baseball in the following offseason.  It is his second stint with the Camden Riversharks, he also played with the team during the 2010 season.

Personal
Costanzo currently owns The Mike Costanzo Farmers Insurance Agency in Springfield, Pennsylvania.

References

External links

1983 births
Living people
All-American college baseball players
American people of Italian descent
Batavia Muckdogs players
Bowie Baysox players
Camden Riversharks players
Carolina Mudcats players
Cincinnati Reds players
Clearwater Threshers players
Coastal Carolina Chanticleers baseball players
Criollos de Caguas players
Hyannis Harbor Hawks players
Liga de Béisbol Profesional Roberto Clemente infielders
Louisville Bats players
Major League Baseball third basemen
Norfolk Tides players
Pensacola Blue Wahoos players
Peoria Saguaros players
Reading Phillies players
Baseball players from Philadelphia
Syracuse Chiefs players
2013 World Baseball Classic players